Songs from Under the Covers is the debut extended play released by British singer-songwriter Katie Waissel, released on 30 November 2009.

Background
In Episode 4 of Green Eyed World, the producers of the show presented Katie the opportunity to fly to Los Angeles, California to write & record her first EP, which at the end of the show was released; Songs from Under the Covers. The EP was given a digital release, and a limited edition CD release.

Track listing

References

2009 debut EPs
Katie Waissel albums